Interleukin-18-binding protein is a protein that in humans is encoded by the IL18BP gene.

The protein encoded by this gene is an inhibitor of the proinflammatory cytokine IL18. This protein binds to IL18, prevents the binding of IL18 to its receptor, and thus inhibits IL18-induced IFN-gamma production. This protein is constitutively expressed and secreted in mononuclear cells. The expression of this protein can be enhanced by IFN-gamma. An elevated level of this protein is detected in the intestinal tissues of patients with Crohn's disease. Three transcript variants encoding the same protein have been found for this gene.

References

Further reading

External links